The 2003–04 Eintracht Frankfurt season was the 104th season in the club's football history. In 2003–04 the club played in the Bundesliga, the first tier of German football. 
It was the club's 100th season in the first tier.

Results

Friendlies

Indoor soccer tournaments

Hannover

Riesa

Competitions

Bundesliga

League table

Results summary

Results by round

Matches

DFB-Pokal

Players

First-team squad
Squad at end of season

Left club during season

Eintracht Frankfurt II

Under-19s

Under-17s

Statistics

Appearances and goals

|}

Transfers

Summer

In:

Out:

Winter

In:

Out:

Notes

References

Sources

External links
 Official English Eintracht website 
 German archive site
 2003–04 Bundesliga season at Fussballdaten.de 

Eintracht Frankfurt seasons
German football clubs 2003–04 season